The 2021–22 NBL season was the 3rd season for the South East Melbourne Phoenix in the NBL.

Roster

Pre-season

Ladder

Game log 

|-style="background:#cfc;"
| 1
| 13 November
| @ Sydney
| W 75–81
| Adnam, Creek (17)
| Ryan Broekhoff (9)
| Izayah Le'afa (4)
| Melbourne Sports and Aquatic Centreclosed event
| 1–0
|-style="background:#fcc;"
| 2
| 15 November
| Illawarra
| L 112–116 (OT)
| Reuben Te Rangi (18)
| Zhou Qi (12)
| Kyle Adnam (12)
| Melbourne Sports and Aquatic Centreclosed event
| 1–1
|-style="background:#fcc;"
| 3
| 20 November
| @ New Zealand
| L 92–90
| Kyle Adnam (21)
| Zhou Qi (9)
| Xavier Munford (4)
| Melbourne Sports and Aquatic Centreclosed event
| 1–2
|-style="background:#cfc;"
| 4
| 28 November
| Melbourne
| W 89–87
| Ryan Broekhoff (21)
| Ryan Broekhoff (7)
| Le'Afa, Munford (4)
| Melbourne Sports Centreclosed event
| 2–2

Regular season

Ladder

Game log 

|-style="background:#cfc;"
| 1
| 4 December
| New Zealand
| W 89–65
| Xavier Munford (27)
| Munford, Pineau (7)
| Xavier Munford (5)
| John Cain Arena3,453
| 1–0
|-style="background:#cfc;"
| 2
| 10 December
| New Zealand
| W 95–88
| Mitch Creek (36)
| Cameron Gliddon (6)
| Xavier Munford (6)
| John Cain Arena3,752
| 2–0
|-style="background:#cfc;"
| 3
| 12 December
| @ Melbourne
| W 86–94
| Zhou Qi (22)
| Zhou Qi (10)
| Creek, Le'afa (5)
| John Cain Arena6,361
| 3–0
|-style="background:#fcc;"
| 4
| 18 December
| @ Sydney
| L 84–73
| Mitch Creek (22)
| Zhou Qi (13)
| Izayah Le'afa (4)
| Qudos Bank Arena6,379
| 3–1

|-style="background:#fcc;"
| 5
| 15 January
| @ Brisbane
| L 100–84
| Mitch Creek (19)
| Mitch Creek (8)
| Xavier Munford (7)
| Nissan Arena2,389
| 3–2
|-style="background:#cfc;"
| 6
| 23 January
| @ Tasmania
| W 63–76
| Mitch Creek (21)
| Ashley, Broekhoff (11)
| Kyle Adnam (5)
| MyState Bank Arena4,235
| 4–2
|-style="background:#cfc;"
| 7
| 25 January
| Cairns
| W 87–77
| Mitch Creek (26)
| Broekhoff, Creek (8)
| Xavier Munford (4)
| Gippsland Regional Indoor Sports Stadium2,634
| 5–2
|-style="background:#cfc;"
| 8
| 29 January
| @ Brisbane
| W 73–88
| Mitch Creek (22)
| Ashley, Broekhoff (7)
| Xavier Munford (5)
| Nissan Arena2,552
| 6–2

|-style="background:#fcc;"
| 9
| 5 February
| Perth
| L 79–101
| Xavier Munford (18)
| Ashley, Creek (9)
| Ashley, Creek, Munford (3)
| John Cain Arena3,727
| 6–3
|-style="background:#cfc;"
| 10
| 7 February
| @ Illawarra
| W 87–88
| Xavier Munford (24)
| Ryan Broekhoff (16)
| Xavier Munford (5)
| WIN Entertainment Centre2,040
| 7–3
|-style="background:#fcc;"
| 11
| 10 February
| Sydney
| L 87–92
| Ryan Broekhoff (25)
| Zhou Qi (10)
| Izayah Le'afa (6)
| John Cain Arena2,133
| 7–4
|-style="background:#cfc;"
| 12
| 13 February
| Tasmania
| W 83–71
| Ryan Broekhoff (18)
| Ryan Broekhoff (8)
| Kyle Adnam (5)
| John Cain Arena3,875
| 8–4
|-style="background:#fcc;"
| 13
| 17 February
| @ Melbourne
| L 94–87
| Mitch Creek (23)
| Zhou Qi (9)
| Xavier Munford (5)
| John Cain Arena5,012
| 8–5
|-style="background:#cfc;"
| 14
| 19 February
| Brisbane
| W 98–94
| Cameron Gliddon (20)
| Ryan Broekhoff (8)
| Kyle Adnam (5)
| John Cain Arena3,252
| 9–5
|-style="background:#cfc;"
| 15
| 26 February
| Perth
| W 86–80
| Kyle Adnam (24)
| Ryan Broekhoff (11)
| Kyle Adnam (6)
| John Cain Arena3,606
| 10–5

|-style="background:#cfc;"
| 16
| 4 March
| @ Adelaide
| W 76–83
| Mitch Creek (29)
| Creek, Zhou Qi (7)
| Mitch Creek (5)
| Adelaide Entertainment Centre4,775
| 11–5
|-style="background:#fcc;"
| 17
| 6 March
| Illawarra
| L 77–83
| Mitch Creek (18)
| Broekhoff, Munford, Zhou Qi (7)
| Xavier Munford (6)
| John Cain Arena2,989
| 11–6
|-style="background:#fcc;"
| 18
| 13 March
| Melbounre
| L 90–98
| Mitch Creek (27)
| Zhou Qi (12)
| Mitch Creek (5)
| John Cain Arena8,319
| 11–7
|-style="background:#fcc;"
| 19
| 17 March
| @ Illawarra
| L 103–97
| Zhou Qi (25)
| Zhou Qi (8)
| Kyle Adnam (6)
| WIN Entertainment Centre2,324
| 11–8
|-style="background:#fcc;"
| 20
| 19 March
| Sydney
| L 89–91
| Xavier Munford (26)
| Zhou Qi (8)
| Adnam, Munford (5)
| John Cain Arena2,717
| 11–9
|-style="background:#cfc;"
| 21
| 25 March
| @ Cairns
| W 74–86
| Brandon Ashley (25)
| Mitch Creek (8)
| Xavier Munford (4)
| Cairns Convention Centre3,044
| 12–9
|-style="background:#fcc;"
| 22
| 27 March
| @ Adelaide
| L 100–92
| Mitch Creek (27)
| Mitch Creek (12)
| Xavier Munford (3)
| Adelaide Entertainment Centre3,765
| 12–10

|-style="background:#fcc;"
| 23
| 2 April
| @ Cairns
| L 90–85
| Mitch Creek (21)
| Xavier Munford (7)
| Mitch Creek (4)
| Cairns Convention Centre3,206
| 12–11
|-style="background:#fcc;"
| 24
| 7 April
| Melbourne
| L 88–90
| Mitch Creek (20)
| Zhou Qi (7)
| Izayah Le'afa (6)
| John Cain Arena4,167
| 12–12
|-style="background:#cfc;"
| 25
| 10 April
| @ New Zealand
| W 89–99
| Xavier Munford (25)
| Mitch Creek (8)
| Xavier Munford (8)
| Bendigo Stadiumnot available
| 13–12
|-style="background:#fcc;"
| 26
| 17 April
| Tasmania
| L 80–84
| Mitch Creek (27)
| Mitch Creek (7)
| Xavier Munford (5)
| John Cain Arena3,056
| 13–13
|-style="background:#cfc;"
| 27
| 22 April
| Adelaide
| W 94–91
| Cameron Gliddon (24)
| Brandon Ashley (11)
| Xavier Munford (7)
| John Cain Arena4,673
| 14–13
|-style="background:#cfc;"
| 28
| 24 April
| @ Perth
| W 100–102 (OT)
| Xavier Munford (24)
| Dane Pineau (8)
| Xavier Munford (10)
| RAC Arena10,271
| 15–13

Transactions

Re-signed

Additions

Subtractions

Awards

Club awards 
 Club MVP: Mitch Creek

See also 
 2021–22 NBL season
 South East Melbourne Phoenix

References

External links 

 Official Website

South East Melbourne Phoenix
South East Melbourne Phoenix seasons
South East Melbourne Phoenix season